Jordi Sánchez Ribas (born 11 November 1994) is a Spanish professional footballer who plays as a forward for Widzew Łódź.

Club career
Born in Barcelona, Catalonia, Sánchez represented UA Horta, CF Damm and CF Badalona as a youth. He made his first team debut for the latter on 12 May 2013, playing the last 28 minutes in a 1–3 Segunda División B away loss against CD Olímpic de Xàtiva.

Sánchez scored his first senior goal on 6 October 2013, netting the equalizer in a 1–2 home loss against the same opponent. The following 13 January, he was loaned to Tercera División side CD Masnou until June.

In January 2015, Sánchez signed for UE Vilassar de Mar six months after joining Masnou permanently. On 11 June of that year, he joined AE Prat still in the fourth division.

On 5 July 2016, Sánchez moved to Valencia CF, being assigned to the reserves in the third division. On 21 June 2018, he signed a two-year contract with Segunda División side CD Numancia.

Sánchez made his professional debut on 13 September 2018, coming on as a second-half substitute for Borja Viguera in a 1–2 home loss against Sporting de Gijón, for the season's Copa del Rey. He scored his first professional goal on 23 December, netting the equalizer in a 1–1 away draw against AD Alcorcón.

On 31 January 2019, Sánchez was loaned to third division side UD Ibiza until June. On 12 July he returned to Valencia's reserves, now in a temporary deal.

On 27 August 2020, Sánchez agreed to a two-year contract with second division newcomers CD Castellón. The following 29 January, he moved to third tier side UCAM Murcia CF on loan for the remainder of the campaign.

On 21 June 2021, he signed for Albacete of the RFEF First Division. On 11 June 2022, Albacete Balompié would achieve promotion to the Segunda División, after a 1–2 play-off final win against Deportivo de La Coruña at the Riazor Stadium, thanks to Jordi's goal in extra time.

On 2 July 2022, Sánchez signed a two-year contract with Polish Ekstraklasa side Widzew Łódź.

References

External links

1994 births
Living people
Footballers from Barcelona
Spanish footballers
Association football forwards
Segunda División players
Primera Federación players
Segunda División B players
Tercera División players
Ekstraklasa players
CF Badalona players
CD Masnou players
AE Prat players
Valencia CF Mestalla footballers
CD Numancia players
UD Ibiza players
CD Castellón footballers
UCAM Murcia CF players
Albacete Balompié players
Widzew Łódź players
Spanish expatriate footballers
Expatriate footballers in Poland
Spanish expatriate sportspeople in Poland